Julije (Julio) Bajamonti (Italian: Giulio Bajamonti; 4 August 1744 – 12 November 1800) was a medical historian, writer, translator, encyclopedist, historian, philosopher, and musician from the city of Split in present-day Croatia. His wife was Ljuba Bajamonti, a Split commoner.

Bajamonti is known for composing the first preserved oratorio in Croatia (La traslazione di San Doimo), writing about the history of Split (unfinished and unpublished), and helping Alberto Fortis, with his journey around Dalmatia which also included the discovery of the now famous South Slavic Muslim song, Hasanaginica.

After the fall of Venice in 1797 he urged that Dalmatia should be annexed to the Habsburg monarchy. In his speech in 1797 he stated that Austria was the successor of the old Venetian state. Like many other intellectuals along the Dalmatian coast Bajamonti wrote most of his works in Italian. Niccolò Tommaseo claims that there was no one in Italy who wrote better than Bajamonti during his time.

He performed his medical work in the cities of Split, Hvar, and Kotor (in the area of Boka Kotorska in today's Montenegro).

See also 
Antonio Bajamonti
House of Bajamonti

References

External links
 
 Free scores by  Bajamonti Julije  on loumy.org
 

1744 births
1800 deaths
Writers from Split, Croatia
Croatian philosophers
Croatian composers
18th-century Venetian historians
18th-century composers
18th-century male musicians
18th-century musicians
Musicians from Split, Croatia
Physicians from Split, Croatia